The following is an alphabetically sorted list of products manufactured under the Olympus company brand.

Photography

Digital cameras

Film cameras

Lenses

Voice Recorders

Digital Voice Recorders

Microcassette Voice Recorders

Minicassette Voice Recorders

Digital audio players

Software 
Olympus also sold CAMEDIA Master 4.x which was a photo editor.

See also 
 Timeline of Olympus creative digital cameras
 Olympus OM system

References

External links 

Olympus Cameras History

Technology-related lists
 
Lists of photography topics
Lists of products